Lac de Bellefontaine is a lake at Bellefontaine in the Jura department of France. The lake is located close to Lac des Mortes.

Bellefontaine